The Three Musketeers (French: D'Artagnan L'Intrépide), also known as The Glorious Musketeers in the UK, is a 1974 French-Italian-British animated adventure film, directed by animators John Halas and Franco Cristofani. It is based on Alexandre Dumas's classic French novel, The Three Musketeers, first published in 1844.

Cast

Release
In the UK, the film aired on BBC Two on 29 December 1978. In the United States, the film was distributed by National Telefilm Associates. It was released on VHS by Children's Video Library in 1981, and Celebrity Home Entertainment in 1991. To date, the only DVD release of the English dub available is a Greek region 2 one by third-party company Cine Net Entertainment, featuring both English and Greek audio tracks.

Italy
A different version was first released in Italy in 1977, titled Viva D'Artagnan, created by Aldo Frollini and Giovanni Brusatori. It features music sung by Cugini di campagna, with lyrics by Bruno Zambrini and Gianni Zambrini. There's also an opening scene added, in which the film's comic relief owl starts narrating the story throughout the rest of the film. It was released on VHS by Playtime Home Video.

Accolades
The film won a Special Prize at the Giffoni Film Festival in 1978.

Music
A soundtrack album was released on LP vinyl by Philips in 1974. The same year, a version of the album with a gatefold sleeve and a booklet was released. A 2-disc compilation promo CD by Warner Chappell Music entitled Cinema, was released in 2007, featuring tracks 5, 19 and 20. Tracks 1 and 6 were released for streaming on 19 December 2014. Tracks 2, 5, 9, 10, 12, 13, 14, 19 and 20 were also included in another compilation album, Le Cinéma De Polnareff, released by Universal Music France in 2011. In this album, Wake Up, It's A Lovely Day and Freedom and Liberty, re-recorded versions of Et Hop On Va Tout Changer and Pour Vivre En Liberté for the English dub are included, with lyrics by Martin Shaer.

Fonit Cetra released in 1977 a soundtrack album of Viva D'Artagnan on a 7-inch single vinyl, featuring two songs. A year later, it released a compilation children's album on LP vinyl, called Supersigle tv, including the first song.

Track listing
The album is split in two vinyl discs, one for tracks 1 to 10, and another one for tracks 11 to 20. Lyrics by Michel Polnareff and Pierre Grosz (tracks 1 and 11).

References

External links
 

Films based on The Three Musketeers
1970s French animated films
Italian animated films
1970s British animated films
1974 animated films
Films directed by John Halas
1970s English-language films
1970s British films
1970s Italian films